Club de Futbol Gavà is a Spanish football team based in Gavà, in the autonomous community of Catalonia. Founded in 1922, it plays in 1ª Catalana – Group 2, holding home games at Estadi La Bòbila, with a capacity of 2,550 seats.

History 
The club was founded on 26 May 1921 thanks to the initiative of the local veterinarian Mr. Seculím who brought together best football players of Gavà city.

Season to season

9 seasons in Segunda División B
33 seasons in Tercera División

Former coaches
 Antoni Llebaría Pons (1996–1999)
 José Cabezas Benavente (1999)
 Manuel Rodríguez Carballo(1999)
 Ramón Calderé (2000–2001)
   Jaume Bonet (2009–2010)
 Óscar Alcides Mena (2016–2017)
  Juan Camilo Vázquez (2019–2020)
  Jorge Sánchez Pérez (2020–)

Notable players
Note: this list includes players that have appeared in at least 100 league games and/or have reached international status.

References

External links
Official website 
Futbolme team profile 
Official blog 

 
Football clubs in Catalonia
Association football clubs established in 1922
1922 establishments in Spain